Sayeed Khokon is a Bangladeshi businessman, politician who's served as mayor of Dhaka South City Corporation from 2015 to 2020. His father  Mohammad Hanif was Dhaka city's first elected mayor. He is the Executive Member of Bangladesh Awami League Central Committee.

Early life 
Khokon's father Mohammad Hanif was the first elected mayor of Dhaka.

Mayor election
Khokon collected nomination form of Awami League on 24 March 2015. He won in the first Dhaka South City Corporation election on 29 April 2015.

On 26 July 2017, Khokon blamed Dhaka Water Supply and Sewerage Authority for water logging problems in the city.

On 26 December 2019, Khokon collected Dhaka South City Corporation nomination papers from Awami League. The nomination went to Sheikh Fazle Noor Taposh and Khokon accordingly accepted the decision of the party and party president, Prime Minister Sheikh Hasina.

A case was filed against Sayeed Khokon and several other for allegedly embezzling 350m BDT by the Gulistan Fulbaria City Supermarket-2 owners' association president Md Delwar Hossain in December 2020. The money had been paid for allocation of shops in block A between 2015 and 2019 which were later demolished for violating the original design of the complex. 911 shops were demolished by the city corporation on 9 December.

Judge KM Emrul Kayesh of Dhaka Court on 28 June 2021 order the accounts of Khokon and his wife, sister, and mother be frozen. The accounts were frozen after a request from the deputy director of the Anti-Corruption Commission Jalal Uddin Ahmed who was in charge of the investigation on Khokon. On 28 July 2021, Bangladesh Financial Intelligence Unit sought information on accounts held by Khokon from banks in Bangladesh. He blamed his successor, Sheikh Fazle Noor Taposh, for instigating the actions of Anti Corruption Commission. Taposh did not respond to the allegations. He also alleged his successor kept millions of city corporation fund in Modhumoti Bank Limited, which Taposh owned. Two defamation suits were filed against Khokon for his comments about Taposh but Taposh himself called for their withdrawal.

References

1970 births
Living people
Awami League politicians
Bangladeshi businesspeople
Mayors of Dhaka